Alnwick's town walls are a 15th-century defensive structure built around the town of Alnwick in England.

History
Alnwick's town walls were built in the 15th century following a period of considerable border instability and raiding that had caused significant damage to Alnwick's economy. Henry VI permitted the town to charge murage on selected imports to Alnwick in 1434 and, using these taxes, protective walls with four gates were built in stone over a period of around fifty years. The local Percy family controlled the neighbouring Alnwick Castle and the Bondgate Tower was decorated with their lion crest - an unusual feature for town gates of this period which normally celebrated civic, rather than local noble, identities.

The surviving sections include the 15th century Bondgate Tower and Pottergate (which was rebuilt in the 18th century). Both are scheduled monuments and Grade I listed buildings.

See also
List of town walls in England and Wales

References

Bibliography
Creighton, Oliver Hamilton and Robert Higham. (2005) Medieval Town Walls: an Archaeology and Social History of Urban Defence. Stroud, UK: Tempus. .
Pettifer, Adrian. (2002) English Castles: a Guide by Counties. Woodbridge, UK: Boydell Press. .

City walls in the United Kingdom
Grade I listed walls
Alnwick